The Arnold conjecture, named after mathematician Vladimir Arnold, is a mathematical conjecture in the field of symplectic geometry, a branch of differential geometry.

Statement

Let  be a compact symplectic manifold.

The function  is called a Hamiltonian function.

The family of vector fields integrates to a 1-parameter family of diffeomorphisms .

Nondegenerate Hamiltonian and weak Arnold conjecture

A Hamiltonian diffeomorphism  is called nondegenerate if its graph intersects the diagonal of  transversely.

The weak Arnold conjecture says that for a nondegenerate Hamiltonian diffeomorphism on  the above integer is a lower bound of its number of fixed points.

References

Symplectic geometry
Conjectures